South Carolina Highway 105 Connector may refer to:

South Carolina Highway 105 Connector (Cherokee County), a connector route near Draytonville
South Carolina Highway 105 Connector (Saratt), a connector route in Saratt

105 Connector
105 Connector